

A 

 Israel Asper - CanWest, Canada

B 

 Jeff Bezos, Washington Post
 Conrad Black
 Martin Bouygues - TF1, Bouygues
 Silvio Berlusconi - Canale 5, Italia 1, Rete 4, Telecinco, Il Giornale, Panorama (Italian magazine)

C  
 
 Gustavo Cisneros - Venevisión

D 

 Richard Desmond - Northern & Shell, UK
 Felix Dennis, UK
 Barry Diller - USA Interactive, US

E 

 Michael Eisner - Walt Disney Company, US
 Charlie Ergen - Dish Network, US

F 

 Larry Flynt - Hustler, UK

G 

 David Geffen - DreamWorks Animation SKG
 Al Gore - current.tv

H

I

J 

 Steve Jobs - Pixar, US

K 

 Jeffrey Katzenberg - DreamWorks Animation SKG, US
 Leo Kirch - KirchMedia, Germany

L

M 

 José Roberto Marinho - Globo, Brazil
 Roberto Irineu Marinho - Globo, Brazil
 João Roberto Marinho - Globo, Brazil
 Robert Maxwell - Maxwell Communications Corporation, UK
 Jean-Marie Messier - Vivendi Universal, France
 Javier Moll, Spain, Australia
 James Murdoch - British Sky Broadcasting, UK
 Rupert Murdoch - News Corporation, US, UK, Australia

N

O 
 Tony O'Reilly, Independent News & Media, Ireland

P

Q

R 

 Sumner Redstone - Viacom, CBS Corporation, US

S 
 Patrick Soon-Shiong, Los Angeles Times & San Diego Tribunal
 Steven Spielberg - DreamWorks Animation SKG

T  
 Lisa Tolliver, US
 Ted Turner, US

U

V

W 

 Bob Weinstein - The Weinstein Company, US
 Harvey Weinstein - The Weinstein Company, US
 Joseph West - SuperQuotes.Us, US
 Oprah Winfrey, Harpo Productions

X

Y

Z 
Media proprietors